The East Midlands is one of nine official regions of England at the first level of ITL for statistical purposes. It comprises the eastern half of the area traditionally known as the Midlands. It consists of Leicestershire, Derbyshire, Lincolnshire (except North and North East Lincolnshire), Northamptonshire, Nottinghamshire and Rutland. The most populous settlements in the region are Derby, Leicester, Lincoln, Mansfield, Northampton and Nottingham. Other notable settlements include Boston, Buxton, Chesterfield, Corby, Coalville, Gainsborough, Glossop, Grantham, Hinckley, Kettering, Loughborough, Louth, Market Harborough, Matlock, Newark-on-Trent, Oakham, Skegness, Wellingborough, Worksop and Towcester

With a sufficiency-level world city ranking, Nottingham is the only settlement in the region to be classified by the Globalization and World Cities Research Network.

The region is primarily served by East Midlands Airport, which lies between Derby, Leicester and Nottingham.

Physical Features

The region's major rivers, the Nene, the Soar, the Trent, and the Welland, flow in a northeasterly direction towards the Humber and the Wash. The Derwent, conversely, rises in the High Peak before flowing south to join the Trent some  before its conflux with the Soar, and the Witham flows in an arch, first north to Lincoln before heading south to the Wash.

The centre of the East Midlands area lies roughly between Bingham, Nottinghamshire and Bottesford, Leicestershire. The geographical centre of England lies in Higham on the Hill in west Leicestershire, close to the boundary between the Leicestershire and Warwickshire. Some 88 per cent of the land is rural in character, although agriculture accounts for less than three per cent of the region's jobs.

Church Flatts Farm in Coton in the Elms, South Derbyshire, is the furthest place from the sea in the UK. In April 1936 the first Ordnance Survey trig point was sited at Northamptonshire Cold Ashby in Peterborough
The Royal Society of Wildlife Trusts and The Wildlife Trusts are based next to the River Trent and Newark Castle railway station. The National Centre for Earth Observation is at the University of Leicester.

Geology
The region is home to large quantities of limestone, and the East Midlands Oil Province. Charnwood Forest is noted for its abundant levels of volcanic rock, estimated to be approximately 600 million years old.

A quarter of the UK's cement is manufactured in the region, at three sites in Hope and Tunstead in Derbyshire, and Ketton Cement Works in Rutland. Of the aggregates produced in the region, 25 per cent are from Derbyshire and four per cent from Leicestershire. Lincolnshire and Nottinghamshire each produce around 30 per cent of the region's sand and gravel output.

Barwell in Leicestershire was the site of Britain's largest meteorite on 24 December 1965. The 2008 Lincolnshire earthquake was 5.2 in magnitude.

Environment
Areas of the East Midlands designated by the East Midlands Biodiversity Partnership as Biodiversity Conservation Areas include:
Charnwood Forest
Coversand Heaths
Derbyshire Peak Fringe and Lower Derwent
Humberhead Levels
Leighland Forest
The Lincolnshire Limewoods and Heaths
The Lincolnshire coast
The Peak District
Rockingham Forest
Sherwood Forest
Rutland, SW Lincolnshire and N Northamptonshire
The Wash

Areas of the East Midlands designated by the East Midlands Biodiversity Partnership as Biodiversity Enhancement Areas include:
The Coalfields
The Daventry Grasslands
The Fens
The Lincolnshire Coastal Grazing Marshes
The Lincolnshire Wolds
The National Forest
The Yardley-Whittlewood Ridge

Two of the nationally designated Areas of Outstanding Natural Beauty are:
The Peak District
The Lincolnshire Wolds

Forestry
Several towns in the southern part of the region, including Market Harborough, Desborough, Rothwell, Corby, Kettering, Peterborough, Thrapston, Oundle and Stamford, lie within the boundaries of what was once Rockingham Forest – designated a royal forest by William the Conqueror and was long hunted by English kings and queens.

The National Forest is an environmental project in central England run by The National Forest Company. It stretches from the western outskirts of Leicester in the east to Burton upon Trent in the west, and is planned to link the ancient forests of Needwood and Charnwood.

Sherwood Forest in Nottinghamshire attracts many visitors, and is perhaps best known for its ties with the legend of Robin Hood.

Governance
Regional financial funding decisions for the East Midlands are taken by East Midlands Councils, based in Melton Mowbray. East Midlands Councils is an unelected body made up of representatives of local government in the region. The defunct East Midlands Development Agency was headquartered next to the BBC's East Midlands office in Nottingham and made financial decisions regarding economic development in the region. Since the Conservative-Liberal Democrat coalition government launched its austerity programme after the 2010 general election, regional bodies such as those have been devolved to smaller groups now on a county level. As a region today, there is no overriding body with significant financial or planning powers for the East Midlands.

Historic counties

The historic counties ceased to be used for any administrative purpose in 1899 but remain important to some people, notably for county cricket.

Urban areas
The East Midlands region contains many urban areas which include:

Greater Nottingham (includes the Derbyshire towns of Alfreton, Belper, Heanor, Ilkeston, Long Eaton, Ripley and Sandiacre as well as the city of Derby. It also covers Nottingham, Mansfield, Arnold, Beeston, Carlton Hucknall and West Bridgford. This means it spans parts of both Derbyshire and Nottinghamshire.) (Pop: 729,977)
Leicester Urban Area (Pop: 650,000)
Derby Urban Area (Pop: 270,468)Mansfield Urban Area''' (Spanning Mansfield, Sutton-in-Ashfield and Kirkby-in-Ashfield) (Pop: 158,114)Lincoln Urban Area (Spanning Lincoln, North Hykeham and other villages) (Pop: 115,000)Burton upon Trent and Swadlincote Green Belt (Which although isn't an urban area itself, it spans two counties between Staffordshire and Derbyshire near the towns of Burton-upon-Trent and Swadlincote to restrict building)

Towns and cities
Major towns and cities in the East Midlands region include:
Bold indicates city status.

Population > 300,000
 Leicester, LEC
 Nottingham, NTT
Population > 200,000
 Derby, DBY
 Northampton, NTH
Population > 100,000
 Lincoln, LIN
 Mansfield, NTT
Population > 50,000
 Beeston, NTT
 Chesterfield, DBY
 Corby, NTH
 Hinckley, LEC
 Kettering, NTH
 Loughborough, LEC
 Wellingborough, NTH
Population > 25,000
 Arnold, NTT
 Boston, LIN
 Coalville, LEC
 Daventry, NTH
 Glossop, DBY
 Grantham, LIN
 Hucknall, NTT
 Ilkeston, DBY
 Kirkby-in-Ashfield, NTT
 Long Eaton, DBY
 Market Harborough, LEC
 Melton Mowbray, LEC
 Newark-on-Trent, NTT
 Rushden, NTH
 Spalding, LIN
 Sutton-in-Ashfield, NTT
 Swadlincote, DBY
 West Bridgford, NTT
 Wigston, LEC
 Worksop, NTT

Population > 10,000
 Belper, DBY
 Bolsover, DBY
 Bourne, LIN
 Brackley, NTH
 Buxton, DBY
 Desborough, NTH
 Dronfield, DBY
 Earl Shilton, LEC
 Eastwood, NTT
 Eckington, DBY
 Gainsborough, LIN
 Heanor, DBY
 Louth, LIN
 Lutterworth, LEC
 Mablethorpe, LIN
 Mansfield Woodhouse, NTT
 New Mills, DBY
 North Hykeham, LIN
 Oadby, LEC
 Oakham, RUT
 Retford, NTT
 Ripley, DBY
 Shepshed, LEC
 Skegness, LIN
 Sleaford, LIN
 Stamford, LIN
 Stapleford, NTT
 Staveley, DBY
 Syston, LEC

Transport
Nine per cent of all jobs in the region are in logistics. Traffic in the region is growing at two per cent per year – the highest growth rate of all UK regions. It is estimated that about 140,000 heavy goods vehicle journeys are made inside the region each day.

Road
The M1 (part of the E13 European route) serves the four largest urban areas in the region and affords a motorway link between London, Yorkshire, and North East England. Additionally, the M6 begins on the south-western edge of the region, providing links to the West Midlands and North West England. Both connect to other major routes providing further links to other parts of the UK.

To the east of the largest cities lies the A1 (part of the European route E15, which is important for journeys to and from ports on England's north-east coast and the capital, and is a major artery for the United Kingdom's agricultural industry. The A46 largely follows the Fosse Way, which has linked the south-western and north-eastern parts of England since Roman times. The A43 dual carriageway connects the East Midlands via the M40 motorway corridor with the university city of Oxford, as well as South of England and Solent ports further afield. The historically important A5 runs along the south-west Leicestershire boundary to the south of Lutterworth and Hinckley. The A14 runs through the north of Northamptonshire, serving the settlements of Kettering and Corby alongside surrounding areas, and is a major route between the region and the East of England, including the university city of Cambridge, and the major port of Felixstowe.

Airports

East Midlands Airport in North West Leicestershire is situated in proximity to the region's largest cities; some 14 miles from the centres of Derby and Nottingham, with central Leicester being some 21 miles away and Lincoln further north east being 43 miles away. The airport is the region's biggest public airport, used by over 4 million passengers annually.

Rivalry between the region's three biggest cities has led to a long-running discussion about the identity of both the airport, and region, with the East Midlands rarely found on any non-political map of the UK. The name was at one point changed to Nottingham East Midlands Airport so as to include the name of the city that is supposedly most internationally recognisable. However, the airport has a Derby phone number and postcode, and is in Leicestershire, but is officially assigned to Nottingham by IATA. As a result of the dispute, the name change reverted.

Three of the world's four main international air-freight companies (integrators) have their UK operations at EMA: DHL, UPS and TNT Express (TNT bought by UPS); FedEx have theirs at Stansted. It is the second-largest freight airport in the UK after Heathrow, but most freight from EMA is carried on dedicated planes, whereas most freight from Heathrow is carried on passenger planes (bellyhold). Royal Mail have their main airport hubs at Heathrow and EMA, as EMA is conveniently near the M1, A42 and A50. Heathrow takes some 60 per cent of UK air freight, and EMA some 10 per cent, with Stansted, Manchester and Gatwick next. Air freight has grown at EMA from 1994 to 2004 from about 10,000 to over 250,000 tonnes. The main hours of cargo flying are from 20:00–05:00; domestic cargo flies into the airport in the evening, then from 23:30 to 01:30 cargo flies to European capitals and from 03:00–05:00 from Europe to EMA. Royal Mail flights from EMA go to Belfast, Edinburgh, Inverness, Aberdeen, Newcastle, Exeter and Bournemouth, and it is the largest UK Royal Mail air hub, with eleven flights per night. DHL is the main route carrier at EMA by far with 20 flights per night, UPS have 6, and TNT have 2 (Belfast and Liège); for hubs in Europe, DHL flies to Leipzig, UPS to Cologne, and TNT at Liège.

Smaller airports in the region include Retford Gamston Airport, Nottingham Airport, Leicester Airport, Hucknall Airfield, Sywell Aerodrome, Bruntingthorpe Aerodrome and Humberside Airport. Robin Hood Airport Doncaster Sheffield lies just outside the East Midlands in South Yorkshire.

Railway

Three of the United Kingdom's mainline railways serve the region: the Midland Main Line, the East Coast Main Line, and the West Coast Main Line (Northampton Loop) providing services terminating at London St Pancras, London King's Cross and London Euston respectively. England's primary south-west to north-east Cross Country Route runs through Derby and Chesterfield.

A land speed record for trains was broken in the region. Although the record was set in 1938, the current world speed record for steam trains is held by 4468 Mallard, which clocked  between Grantham and Peterborough, pulling six coaches on the East Coast Main Line near Little Bytham in Lincolnshire, on 3 July 1938. The Mallard record was unbroken by any British rail train until 6 June 1973, when an InterCity 125 between Northallerton and Thirsk reached . Mallard in 1938 had six carriages and a dynamometer car.

There are plans to bring a new high-speed rail line through the East Midlands as part of the High Speed 2 project, of which Phase 2 would bring a new line connecting Birmingham to Leeds, with a proposed station in Toton known as the East Midlands Hub It would also serve the region via "classic-compatible" tracks serving Chesterfield and Sheffield, just outside the region.

Water

The Trent is a navigable river used to transport goods to the Humber, as well as passing by many power stations. The Trent is the only river in England able to supply cooling water for power stations for most of its length; it has the largest water capacity in England, although it is not the longest.

Several rivers in the region gave their name to early Rolls-Royce jet engines, namely the Nene, the Welland, and the Soar.

Trams

Nottingham is the only city in the region served by a light railway system, operated by Nottingham Express Transit.

Transport policy
As part of the transport planning system, the now defunct Regional Assembly was under statutory requirement to produce a Regional Transport Strategy to provide long term planning for transport in the region. This involved region wide transport schemes such as those carried out by the Highways Agency and Network Rail.

Local transport authorities in the region carry out planning through a Local Transport Plan (LTP). The most recent LTPs are for the period 2006–11. The following East Midland transport authorities published an LTP online: Derbyshire, Leicestershire. Lincolnshire, Northamptonshire, Nottinghamshire and Rutland U.A. The unitary authorities of Derby, Leicester and Nottingham They have each written a joint LTP in collaboration with their respective local county councils.

History

Romans
A historical basis for such a region exists in the territory of the Corieltauvi tribe. When the Romans took control, they made Leicester (Ratae Corieltauvorum) one of their main forts. The main town in the region in Roman times was Lincoln, at the confluence of the Fosse Way and Ermine Street.

Anglo-Saxons and the Danelaw
After the withdrawal of the Romans, the area was settled by Angles, a Germanic people who gave the East Midlands most of the place-names it has today. They eventually founded the Kingdom of Mercia, meaning “borderlands,” as it borders the Welsh people to the west. The region also corresponds to the later Five Boroughs of the Danelaw, the area that Vikings from Denmark controlled. In about 917 the region was subdivided between Danelaw (Vikings) to the north, and Mercia (Anglo-Saxons) to the south. By 920 this border had moved north to the River Humber. Evidence of the Danelaw can be seen in place-name endings of the region's villages, particularly towards the east. The Danes under Canute recaptured the area between about 1016 and 1035, but it came back under English control after Canute's death that same year.

Civil War
The region's two main battles in the English Civil War were the Battle of Naseby in northern Northamptonshire on 14 June 1645, and the Battle of Winceby on 11 October 1643 in eastern Lincolnshire.

Scientific heritage
Isaac Newton, born in Grantham in 1642, is perhaps the most prolific scientist. His accomplishments include calculus, Newton's laws of motion, and Newton's law of universal gravitation, among many others. There is a shopping centre named in his honour in Grantham. Thomas Simpson from Leicestershire is known for Simpson's rule. Roger Cotes invented the concept of the radian in 1714, but the term was not so-named until 1873.

Henry Cavendish, loosely connected with Derbyshire, discovered hydrogen in 1766 (although the element's name came from Antoine Lavoisier), and Cavendish was the first to estimate an accurate mass of the Earth in 1798 in his Cavendish experiment. The Cavendish Laboratory at the University of Cambridge is named after a relative. Herbert Spencer coined the term "survival of the fittest" in 1864, which was once strongly linked with social Darwinism. Sir John Flamsteed was the first Astronomer Royal of the Royal Observatory, Greenwich in 1675. Robert Bakewell, of Dishley in Leicestershire and known for his English Leicester sheep, arrived at selective breeding; his English Longhorn were the first ever cattle bred for beef.

George Boole, pioneer of Boolean logic (upon which all digital electronics and computers depend), was born in Lincoln in 1815. The application of Boole's theory to digital circuit design would come in 1937 by Claude Shannon. Boole's grandson, the physicist G. I. Taylor, made significant experimental contributions to quantum mechanics. The first practical demonstration of radar was near Daventry in 1935. Robert Robinson, of Chesterfield in Derbyshire, invented the circular symbol in 1925 for the pi bonds of the benzene ring, as found on all structural diagrams of aromatic compounds. Nicola Pellow, a maths undergraduate at Leicester Polytechnic, whilst at CERN in November 1990, wrote the world's second web browser.

Silicone was discovered in 1899 by Prof Frederic Kipping at University College, Nottingham. Michael Creeth of Northampton discovered the hydrogen-bonding mechanism between DNA bases, allowing the structure of DNA to be discovered. Nottinghamshire's Ken Richardson was in charge of the team at Pfizer in Sandwich, Kent that in 1981 discovered Fluconazole (Diflucan), the world's leading antifungal medication, especially useful for those with weakened immune systems. It has few side effects. Richardson is now one of the few Britons in the National Inventors Hall of Fame. Don Grierson at the University of Nottingham was the first to produce a Genetically modified tomato, which became the first GM food on sale in the UK and in the United States.

Louis Essen, a Nottingham physicist, made advances in the quartz clock in the 1930s at the National Physical Laboratory in Teddington, to produce the quartz ring clock in 1938, and the caesium clock, known as the atomic clock, in 1955. During the war he invented the cavity resonance wavemeter to find the first accurate value of the speed of light. The atomic clock works on differences in magnetic spin. Before Essen's invention, the second was defined in terms of the orbit of the Earth round the Sun; he changed it in 1967 to be based on the hyperfine structure of the caesium-133 atom. Coordinated Universal Time (UTC), in Paris, takes the average of 300 atomic clocks around the world.

On the early morning of Tuesday 26 February 1935 the radio transmitter at Daventry was used for what became known as the "Daventry Experiment" which involved the first-ever practical demonstration of radar, by its inventor Robert Watson-Watt and Arnold Frederic Wilkins. The interference picked up from the aircraft allowed its approximate navigational position to be estimated, and therefore proved that it was possible to detect the position of aircraft using radio waves. The success of the experiment persuaded the British government to fund the development of a network of full scale radar stations on the south coast of England, which became known as Chain Home, which provided a decisive advantage to the RAF in the Battle of Britain in 1940.

Culture and identity

Language and dialect

Parts of the East Midlands use a distinctive form of spoken dialect and accent. It also has some history in the beginnings of Received Pronunciation and southern England accents. However, spoken dialect and accent in the northern area of the East Midlands is far more similar to Northern English.

Identity

There is no modern Midlander, or East Midlander, identity. As Robert Shore wrote: "no one is more sceptical about the existence of an overarching Midland identity than Midlanders themselves." Inhabitants of the East Midlands tend to identify themselves either on a county or town basis, regarding the East Midlands as simply a bureaucratic area that lumps together dissimilar places. In the North of the region, in areas such as North Nottinghamshire and North Derbyshire, people culturally identify as Northerners. For example, a study by YouGov in 2018 found that a quarter of the inhabitants of the region identified as Northerners. A new area of the North Midlands has been proposed, but this has not taken off. In Bassetlaw, the most northern local authority in the East Midlands area, many of the shared services such as NHS are with South Yorkshire, not with other Midlands areas. The television signal comes mainly from the Emley Moor transmitting station, which broadcasts local news from BBC Look North and Calendar News. And its officially designated BBC Local Radio station in terms of radio coverage is BBC Radio Sheffield. In 2016 Bassetlaw District Council voted to become part of the Sheffield City Region because of the strong local ties.

Food and cuisine

The area is known historically for its food, examples of which include Red Leicester, the Lincolnshire sausage, the Melton Mowbray pork pie, Stilton, the Bakewell pudding, and the Bramley apple.

The arts

Lord Byron and D. H. Lawrence are perhaps the region's best known authors, although the latter only gained full recognition in the late 20th century. The Key Words Reading Scheme (Peter and Jane) was first produced in 1964 by Ladybird of Loughborough and is still in print. The books originated in 1948 with an idea from Douglas Keen of Heanor; the first was British Birds and Their Nests. Ladybird Books were published in Loughborough throughout their 1960s and 1970s heyday, with the site closing in 1998.

Joseph Wright of Derby was an artist whose paintings symbolised the struggle between science and religious values in the Age of Enlightenment. He was also suggested to be "the first professional painter to express the spirit of the Industrial Revolution".

Charles Frederick Worth, born in Lincolnshire in 1825, is considered to be the founder of Parisian haute couture, ostensibly as the world's first true fashion designer.

Religion

William Booth of Nottingham founded The Salvation Army in 1865. Another religious order, the Pilgrim Fathers, originated from Babworth near Retford. The Quakers, also known as the Religious Society of Friends, were founded by Leicestershire-born (Fenny Drayton) George Fox, who had an inspiration whilst living in Mansfield in 1647. Thomas Cranmer from Aslockton compiled the Church of England Book of Common Prayer.

Industrial heritage
The region can claim the world's first factory, Sir Richard Arkwright's Cromford Mill. Additionally, the world's oldest working factory can also be found in the area, producing textiles at Lea Bridge, owned by John Smedley. Both sites are part of the region's only World Heritage Site, the Derwent Valley Mills. An opportunist employee of the Derbyshire textile factories, Samuel Slater of Belper saw his chance and (illegally) eloped in 1789 to Rhode Island in the US after memorising the layout of the textile machinery while working at Jedediah Strutt's Milford Mill. He was warmly welcomed by the inhabitants of the newly formed USA, so much so that he was later named the "Father of the American Industrial Revolution".

Britain's hosiery and knitwear industry was largely based in the region, and in the 1980s it had more textile workers than any other British region. The stocking frame was invented 1587 in Calverton, Nottinghamshire by Rev William Lee; these were the first known knitting machines and heralded the industrial revolution by providing the necessary machinery. The world's first (horse-powered) cotton mill was built in central Nottingham in 1768. Marvel's Mill in Northampton was the first cotton mill to be powered by water.

John Barber of Nottinghamshire had invented a simple gas turbine in 1791 (when living in Nuneaton). Lincoln was the site of the first tank (first built on 8 September 1915, Little Willie was the first tank, and is the oldest surviving tank in the world, originally called the No.1 Lincoln Machine), and Grantham the first diesel engine (in 1892). The jet engine was first developed in the region in Lutterworth and Whetstone, with the VTOL engine also (initially) developed in Hucknall. The first jet aircraft flew from RAF Cranwell in May 1941. During the Second World War, Derby was an important strategic location, as it was in Derby that Rolls-Royce developed and manufactured their iconic Merlin aero-engine. During the Second World War, all of R-R's engineering staff had been transferred to Belper.

Derby was home to an important railway workshop, initially for the Midland Railway, then the London, Midland and Scottish Railway, and finally British Railways. British Rail Research Division in Derby invented the APT (British Rail Class 370) and Maglev. The first ever steel rails were laid in 1857 in Derby railway station for the Midland Railway.

At its peak, Corby Steelworks was the largest in Britain. The collapsible baby buggy was invented in 1965 at Barby, Northamptonshire by Owen Maclaren.

Cooke Optics and Taylor-Hobson were major supplier of lenses for Hollywood; Star Wars was filmed with their lenses, filmed in England. Horace W. Lee invented the inverted telephoto lens (known as the Angénieux retrofocus) in 1931, lengthening the back focal length of the camera for the 1930s Technicolor Process and for vignetting. Arthur Warmisham of Taylor & Hobson invented the first non-telescopic 35 mm zoom lens, the Cooke Varo 40– 120mm Lens, in a camera manufactured by Bell & Howell of the US. The popular 35 mm Eyemo film camera came with Cooke lenses. Much of World War II aerial photography, where definition was important, was through Cooke lenses, due to their Apochromatic process. In the 1950s and 1960s, the Cooke Speed Panchro lenses were the most popular choice for cinema films, then from the 1970s their Varotal zoom lens, which would win Gordon Henry Cook the 1988 Gordon E. Sawyer Award at the Oscars. Harold Hopkins (physicist), of Leicester, also did important work on the zoom lens (he largely invented it) and fibre-optics.

J. P. Knight of Nottingham is credited with inventing green and red traffic lights, installed in London on 9 December 1868, but these lasted only three weeks; traffic lights would be introduced only from the 1920s, again in London (from an American-led design scheme). The first modern-day traffic lights were installed in Piccadilly from August 1926. Edgar Purnell Hooley, a Nottinghamshire surveyor, in 1901 was in Denby and found a stretch of road surface that was smooth from an accidental leak of tar over the surface. He patented a process of mixing tar with chipped stones in 1902, forming Tarmac, a name which he patented. Radcliffe Road (A6011) in West Bridgford in 1902 was the first tarmac road ( long) in the world.

Mettoy was a famous firm in the St James area of Northampton, which from 1933 produced Corgi toys (mostly made in Swansea and designed in Northampton), and in the 1970s it made the space hopper; the company collapsed in 1983, moving to Swansea. In Leicestershire was Palitoy, another world-famous firm in Coalville; General Mills bought it in 1968, but production ceased in 1984 and the site was closed by Hasbro in 1994. Pedigree Dolls & Toys (Sindy) was in Wellingborough, closing in 1982. The first plastic DVD case was made in Corby by Amaray. Britain's first out-of-town shopping centre was opened in November 1964 by GEM at West Bridgford, on a site now owned by ASDA.

Much integrated circuit and semiconductor research was carried out by Plessey at Caswell near Towcester, ahead of much of what was being achieved in America by Jack Kilby; Plessey invented a model of the integrated circuit in 1957. Caswell was later a site for manufacturing monolithic microwave integrated circuits in the 1990s by Marconi. On 15 December 1966, the first electronic telephone exchange in Europe opened at Ambergate in Derbyshire.

Torksey railway viaduct, built across the Trent in 1849, is considered to be the first box girder bridge, designed by Sir John Fowler, 1st Baronet. Nottingham Combined Heating and Power Scheme is the largest district heating system in the UK, centred on the Eastcroft incinerator, opened in 1973.

Second World War

Most of the region was protected by a solitary RAF station, RAF Digby near Sleaford, part of No. 12 Group RAF and controlled from RAF Watnall. Within the East Midlands, only Nottingham was heavily bombed during the Second World War's Blitz, due to the presence of a large Royal Ordnance factory. However, much of the aerial obliteration of Germany was directed from the region, with two bomber groups based in Lincolnshire (No.1 and No.5), and a few squadrons in South Nottinghamshire. The proliferation of Second World War airfields in Lincolnshire has led to it being known as Bomber County.

Regional governance

The current government office region was created in 1994. Government funding decisions moved from Melton Mowbray (the East Midlands Regional Assembly) to Nottingham (the East Midlands Development Agency) in April 2010.

Demographics

For teenage pregnancy rates in the region, Nottingham is the top-tier authority. Of the council districts, Corby has the highest rate. Of the top-tier authorities, Rutland has the lowest rate for any district in England. The council district with the lowest rate is South Northamptonshire, although it has a rate greater than that of Rutland. Rutland has the highest total fertility rate for British counties (top-tier authorities). The borough of Boston has the highest TFR for district councils.

The region has the second-lowest overall population density in England (after South West England), eased by the low population density of Lincolnshire and Rutland. In 2007, the region had a lower percentage of degree-educated people than the English average. Of the region's population, 29.5 per cent live in rural areas.

Ethnicity

Social deprivation

The region as a whole is less deprived than the West Midlands and regions in the North of England. By measurement of Lower Layer Super Output Areas, the East Midlands has more in common with the South of England (except London) than the North, in that it has more areas in the 20 per cent least deprived areas than the 20 per cent most deprived areas, but less so than regions in Southern England. This has been explained by academic statisticians, who claim the area straddles the north–south divide.

The region does not show typical economic characteristics of Northern England (which the West Midlands does), although it is not as affluent as large parts of the South of England. Economically, the East Midlands bears a similarity to South West England.

In March 2011, the average unemployment claimant count for the region was 3.6 per cent. Nottingham and Leicester were the highest with 5.8 per cent each. Next were Corby and Lincoln with 4.9 per cent. The lowest were Rutland and South Northamptonshire with 1.4 per cent each, and Harborough, with 1.6 per cent.

Elections 

At the 2015 general election, 43 per cent of the region's electorate voted Conservative, 32 per cent Labour, 16 per cent UKIP, 6% Liberal Democrat and 3 per cent Green. The division of seats is less equally spread, with 32 Conservative and 14 Labour, and the geographic spread is even more weighted towards the Conservatives, with Labour's 14 seats being in Derby (1), Leicester (3), Nottingham (4) and the East Midlands coalfield (6) – most of these, except Leicester, are in the area defined as the economic North of England, and are in geographically smaller seats. Northamptonshire, Rutland and Lincolnshire are completely Conservative. The region had a 0.2 per cent swing from Labour to Conservative.

In 2009, Nottinghamshire and Derbyshire county councils changed control from Labour to Conservative. From 1993 to 2005, Northampton was controlled by Labour, and is now controlled by the Conservatives. Lincolnshire and Leicestershire have historically been Conservative controlled and hence all the main county councils are now Conservative controlled.

MEPs 

The East Midlands was a five-member constituency for the European Parliament.

Regions

Eurostat NUTS
In the Eurostat Nomenclature of Territorial Units for Statistics (NUTS), the East Midlands form a level-1 NUTS region, coded "UKF", which is subdivided as follows:

Local government 
The official region consists of the following subdivisions:

Economy

The Manufacturing Advisory Service for the region was based on the A606 in Melton Mowbray, next to East Midlands Councils.

Manufacturing

In 2003, 23% of economic output in the East Midlands was in manufacturing, compared to 15% in the UK.

For engineering, Rolls-Royce (the world's second-largest maker of aircraft engines) in Sinfin and Rolls-Royce Marine Power Operations are both in Derby. Siemens Industrial Turbomachinery (former GEC, then Alstom) make industrial gas turbines in Lincoln, with a former division making aero-engine components now part of ITP Engines, based at Whetstone, next door to Hardinge Machine Tools UK (former Bridgeport). Cytec Industries UK (former Uneco, owned since 2016 by Solvay) have a composites research centre in the south of Heanor. Meggitt Polymers & Composites (former Dunlop) are on the A512 in Shepshed, who make seals for aircraft.

Triumph Motorcycles and Ultima Sports (sports cars) are in Hinckley. Cummins make diesel engines in Daventry, and build AC generators in Stamford, with its spares division at Wellingborough (near Mahle). 80% of the world's Formula One cars are made in Northamptonshire. At the north of Motorsport Valley, Cosworth and MAHLE Powertrain (former Cosworth Technology before January 2005) are next to the Nene in Northampton, with an engine block plant off the A509 in Wellingborough. Force India and Delta Motorsport are at Silverstone, Mercedes AMG High Performance Powertrains is in Brixworth, and Mercedes-Benz F1 at Brackley at the A43/A422 roundabout. Near Leicester, Noble are in Barwell and Fenix Automotive in Braunstone. Eibach UK (shock absorbers) is off the B581 in Broughton Astley. KTM UK (high-performance motorcycles) is at Buckingham Industrial Estate in southeast Brackley next to the A43; to the west, next door over the former railway was Brawn GP (former Honda F1 before 2008) near the A422 roundabout in Evenley. Van Hool UK (coachwork) is on Finedon Road Industrial Estate in Wellingborough.

Caetano UK is based near Coalville, a UK coachwork distributor for many coaches, often National Express. AGC Automotive UK make automotive glass (tempered glass and laminated glass) on Round Spinney Industrial Estate in the north of Northampton. Plastic Omnium Automotive make automotive exteriors in the west of Measham. Off the A361 on a former airfield is a manufacturing site of Lippstadt-based Hella UK (LED automobile lighting, and Europe's largest automobile lighting manufacturer) in Chipping Warden and Aston le Walls, close to the Oxfordshire boundary. Ilmor is in Brixworth, and Bowler Offroad is in Belper.

JCB Power Systems is on an old airfield near Foston, Derbyshire and nearby Toyota Manufacturing UK (TMUK) is on an old airfield at Burnaston, where its 3,000 employees make the Auris and Avensis, making 190,000 in 2015. Resonate Group (former DeltaRail Group) is in Derby, and train manufacturer Bombardier UK (former British Rail Engineering Limited before 1996 then ABB Adtranz) is at Derby Litchurch Lane Works, in Litchurch; it built the Nottingham Express Transit AT6/5 trams in 2004, the Electrostar, Turbostar and Aventra fleets, and London Underground trains. South of the factory is Pattonair, a global aircraft components supplier. APPH (part of BBA Aviation) make aircraft landing gear on the B6020 next to Kirkby-in-Ashfield railway station. Raleigh Bicycle Company is based in New Eastwood next to the A610; its former site on Triumph Road is now the quirkily designed Jubilee Campus of the University of Nottingham which has the UK's tallest sculpture (Aspire. Essentra Packaging (former Payne) nearby in Giltbrook, next to A610 near the A6096/B6010 junction next to IKEA, makes tear tape, owned by Essentra; Beamlight Automotive Seating (former site of Magna Seating Systems) is nearby. Giant UK (high performance bicycles) on the Charnwood Edge Business Park at the A46/A607 junction in Cossington near the Midland Main Line and River Wreake. Mettler Toledo UK (industrial weighing) is in the west of Beaumont Leys.

Ferodo is in Chapel-en-le-Frith, who have made brake pads since its founder Herbert Frood invented them in Combs in 1897. Carbolite, which makes industrial furnaces, is based near the B6049/A6187 junction in the Hope Valley. FRAM Industrial (former Eurofilter and part of Champion Laboratories, then UCI-FRAM Group) make air filters for gas turbines in Mansfield on Crown Farm Industrial Estate.

FKI who own Brush Electrical Machines is in Loughborough, home to the Energy Technologies Institute and John Taylor & Co, which although entering administration in 2009, is the largest bell foundry in the world. Eco-Bat Technologies, based in South Darley, west of Matlock, smelt and mine lead, and are the world's biggest producer of lead, and own eighteen sites across the world. Doff Portland, off the A611 at Hucknall, make horticultural pesticides such as slug killer. Dow Hyperlast makes polyurethane products off the A6015 at Birch Vale near Hayfield in north-west Derbyshire, next to the River Sett. Scott Bader develop and manufacture polyester resins for glass-reinforced plastic (fiberglass, and gelcoats) at Wollaston.

Tata Steel Tubes Europe is in Corby, along the A427 near the A43 roundabout. Barnes Aerospace have their European headquarters in central Derby. JJ Churchill make turbine blades for jet engines in the east of Market Bosworth, next to the Battlefield Line Railway. Ross Ceramics north of Derby make ceramic cores for casting turbine blades (at Rolls-Royce). The Alumasc Group is in Burton Latimer. Sealed Air UK on the Telford Way Industrial Estate near Kettering General Hospital makes Bubble Wrap, which its parent USA company invented in 1960. Nearby is Cooney Marine, who make stainless steel davits (marine cranes) and passerelles, and Rothenberger UK (hardware equipment). AVK Group make plumbing fittings and valves on the A6192 south of Staveley. NSK Ltd. has a bearings factory in Newark-on-Trent, its European HQ. Illuma Lighting makes industrial lighting next to the railway in Castle Donington.

The Motor Industry Research Association has an important test track at Higham on the Hill near Hinckley. Hendrickson Europe make truck suspensions at Sywell Airport. Timsons make printers in Kettering. Heckler & Koch is in Lenton. In Worksop near the A60/A57 roundabout Cinch Connectors (part of Safran) have their European plant, making D-subminiature connectors (found on the back of computers); on the Dukeries Industrial Estate, Worksop Galvanizers (Wedge Group) have the largest galvanizing bath (zinc) in the UK, able to fit up to 29 metres in length. Cooper Bussmann (former Hawker Fusegear) makes electrical fuses in Burton on the Wolds off the B676. Pearce Signs, one of the UK's largest sign-makers, is based in New Basford. Nylacast is an international engineered plastics company based in Humberstone, Leicester. Sapa are at Tibshelf on the B6014, on the Saw Pit Lane Industrial Estate with Storetec, the UK base of Wanzl shopping trolleys. Langley Holdings in Retford own Clarke Chapman, Piller Power Systems, and ARO Welding Technologies.

RPC Group in Rushden opposite a Waitrose, on the A6, is a large (international, the largest of its type in Europe) packaging company, and make the bottles for Heinz Tomato Ketchup. Granger's, on the Clover Nook Industrial Estate off the A38 at Pinxton, make Cherry Blossom shoe polish. Fusion Provida based on B6057/A61 junction in Chesterfield makes pipe jointings and electrofusion fittings for the oil and gas industry. Vaillant UK (former Hepworth Heating before 2002, with headquarters in Remscheid) make Glow-worm boilers on the A609 near Belper School. Abel Systems in North Wingfield make demountable systems for trucks. Weightron Bilanciai (weighbridges), are north of Chesterfield on the same estate as Franke & Sissons at Sheepbridge (former Newbold); nearby on the same estate, NIBE Energy Systems supply air source heat pumps.

The Watchkeeper WK450 UAV is built jointly by Thales and Elbit on Scudamore Road in west Leicester, towards the M1; it is tested at Aberporth Airport in Wales; 54 are on order, costing £1bn. At the A563 roundabout BAE Systems Land & Armaments had a tank factory, which closed in May 2011 when it lost the FRES contract, given to General Dynamics; the site, owned by Thales, initially made naval radar systems. The large Sunningdale site on Braunstone Frith was the British Shoe Corporation. Chemring Defence UK (military pyrotechnics) is at Draycott and Church Wilne west of the M1. Invicta Plastics (injection moulding) is on Scudamore Road. Newall Measurement Systems (electronic sensors) is in South Wigston.

Carlton Laser Services make industrial CNC lasers (for laser cutting) next to the railway line and the A563 in Rushey Mead. Hoval, based on the B6166 (former A46) near Newark Northgate station, make industrial boilers in Lincoln for international customers, and have a Royal Warrant. Jayplas, the UK's biggest plastic recycling company is based in Great Oakley, south of Corby off the A6014, with a plastic recycling site in South Normanton. Fairline Boats are based on the Nene in Oundle off the A605 bypass; nearby are Poclain Hydraulics UK on the Nene Business Park. Pinnell & Bax make dinghy boats and sails on the Kings Heath Industrial Estate in north Northampton. Laser Performance makes the Laser sailing boat in Long Buckby next to Maclaren at Long Buckby railway station. Lappset UK (play equipment) is on Telford Way in Kettering; Wicksteed Playscapes are a main manufacturer of playground equipment in the UK, for many decades at Kettering; the company invented the equipment too. Abbott & Co.(Newark) Ltd, Established in 1870 and based in The Newark Boiler Works on Northern Road, Newark, made boilers in the 1870s for the Royal Navy and today design and build a large range pressure vessels, some of which were used recently on HMS Queen Elizabeth (R08).

Spector Lumenex (part of Tyco) make warning systems off the B684 in Mapperley. Flowserve UK (former Worthington-Simpson, then Ingersoll-Dresser) in Balderton are the largest manufacturer of industrial pumps in the UK. Miflex, off the B582 in Lubbesthorpe between Enderby and Kirby Muxloe, make air hoses for diving regulators. Hako Machines UK, a Schleswig-Holstein supplier of industrial sweepers and road cleaners are in Crick. Bostik, which from 1930 until 1990, was owned by British United Shoe Machinery of Leicester, still has a main factory and research site (its construction division) in Belgrave; until 1962 it was made by BB Chemical, with its other main brand being the water-resistant Prestik for making sealing strips. Taylor Hobson (an international metrology company) is north of the A563 in former Thurmaston (inside Leicester), bought by Ametek in 2004; with a former division of the company, Cooke Optics, a camera lens manufacturer, further north in Thurmaston on the west side of the railway. The Gent fire alarm company, now owned by Honeywell since 2005, is off the A563 near the A6030 roundabout in the north of Humberstone. Matsuura Machinery UK (CNC machine tools) is towards Morrisons in Coalville.

Abacus Lighting (former Abacus Municipal) is in the north of Kirkby in Ashfield, north of Sutton Parkway station; it makes street lights, floodlights, supermarket trolley shelters, and installed many of the UK's mobile phone masts. Ardagh (originally Metal Box from 1962, then Impress Group) make tin cans south of the A38, off the B6139, north of Fabrikat; Alpha Rail, off the B6020 near Kirkby-in-Ashfield railway station, claims to be Britain's leading manufacturer of metal railings and guard rail; Pandrol UK in Worksop make resilient rail fastenings. ThyssenKrupp UK is in Lenton, off the A52, and further north is ZF Services UK (wind turbine and automotive gears). At the A6019/A453 south of the tax office in Nottingham is Thomas & Betts UK (former W & J Furse, and bought by ABB in 2012), a world leader in lightning and earthing protection.

Construction and building materials
Topps Tiles are on Grove Park in Enderby, with the national distribution centre of British Gas, the largest warehouse of gas spare parts in Europe, next door. Aggregate Industries (now part of LafargeHolcim since July 2015, when Paris-based Lafarge merged with Swiss-based Holcim) is based at Bardon Hall in Bardon, next to the 912-foot (278 m) Bardon Hill, Leicestershire's highest point. Mountsorrel has the largest granite quarry in Europe, owned by the French company, Lafarge (owned by Redland plc until 1997). BPB plc (British Plasterboard), the world's largest manufacturer of plasterboard (calcium sulphate) who own British Gypsum, is based in East Leake, Nottinghamshire. They also have a large site at Barrow upon Soar. Artex Ltd., part of the same company, is in Ruddington. North Midland Construction is off the B6027 in Huthwaite. Saint-Gobain Isover (insulation) is in Gotham.

Hörmann UK (garage doors) is in Coalville, off the A511. Barratt Developments (housing) is at the A511/B585 roundabout in Ellistown and Battleflat (Bardon), southeast of Coalville; Ibstock is the largest brick manufacturer (900 million a year, with twenty factories) in the UK, nearby to the southwest; . Lafarge Aggregates & Concrete UK is in Syston, next to the A607. Roca UK and Laufen UK (sanitaryware) are in the north of Coalville, next to the A511 on the Hermitage Industrial Estate, towards Stephenson College; Goodwin Barsby make stone crushers. Krohne UK at Wellingborough make Coriolis mass flowmeters. The BSS Group (formerly in Leicester), at the same site as Travis Perkins (owner of the Wickes brand) in north Northampton. Flogas (butane supplier, owned by DCC) is on Watermead Business Park off the A607 in west Syston near Lafarge (Granite House). CPL Industries with a site off the A61 in Wingerworth, are the UK's biggest manufacturer of smokeless fuel. AvantiGas (former Shell Gas LPG) is off the A6192 at junction 29A at Duckmanton in Staveley. Sandvik Mining and Construction UK are on the Astron Business Park, Swadlincote, near Brunel Healthcare; Keystone Lintels and Keylite roof windows, part of the Keystone Group, are nearby. DSF Refractories & Minerals are the UK's last main refractory company at Friden at the A515/A5012 (Via Gellia) junction. Next to the A5, on the region boundary, at Shawell Leics is Redland (Lafarge Roofing until 2008) roof tile factory. Flowflex make compression fittings in Buxton.

Caterpillar Building Construction Products makes backhoe loaders, wheel loaders, telehandlers, and mini excavators. Caterpillar on an old airfield near Desford; the site is also used by Massey Ferguson for their spares division factory. Terex Pegson make mobile caterpillar-tracked crushing machines next to the railway in Coalville. Dacrylate make paint in Kirkby-in-Ashfield. SAME Deutz-Fahr UK, is a tractor manufacturer based in Barby in west Northamptonshire near the M6 north of Daventry, owned by Treviglio of Italy. Toyota Material Handling UK is at Old Dalby on a former ABRO (previously REME) vehicle depot. The Dorman Long engineering consultancy is at Higham Ferrers.

Charles Lawrence International (owned by Malcolm Group), on the Northern Road Industrial Estate in Newark makes EPDM rubber granules and machinery for maintaining artificial sports surfaces. Premier Pitches of Nether Handley, off the A6052 at Unstone in northeast Derbyshire, made the pitch for Wembley Stadium, as well as for many other main pitches. Hewitt Sportsturf, just south of Whetstone next to the M1 in Cosby, supplied the turf (360 rolls) for the Olympic Stadium in March 2011, although it was grown near Scunthorpe; a division of the company, Petersfield Growing Mediums, which supplies compost, has a Royal Warrant. Werner UK (Britain's leading manufacturer of metal step ladders) moved its ABRU site, off the A6 in the south of Belper, to Essex in 2016. Caunton Engineering, steel constructors, on the site of Moorgreen Colliery in Eastwood built the Olympics Water Polo Arena. PTS (part of BSS) at Crick claims to be the main provider of supplies to UK plumbers. Versalift UK (van-mounted access platforms) are at Burton Latimer. Omya UK (industrial minerals) is between the A52 and railway at Derby.

Textiles and clothing

The fashion company Paul Smith is in Lenton. The lingerie companies Gossard, Aristoc, Pretty Polly, and Berlei (formerly owned by Courtaulds, now CUK Clothing) were based in Daybrook; most of their hosiery was made at West Mill in Belper. Speedo International Limited is on the ng2 business park on Queens Drive (near Experian, formerly in Bobbers Mill on the A610 near Basford before 2010). Its LZR Racer suit helped Michael Phelps win eight golds at the 2008 Olympics. In Enderby, on the B582 close to the M69 and a large electricity substation, is Next, created by George Davies in 1981, which is the largest company in the region (and the Midlands) by number of employees with 59,000, and has the second largest turnover (£3 billion) of companies headquartered in the region, after Boots (£6 billion).

Boden (clothing) is on the Meridian estate in Leicester. Wolsey (clothing) is off the A563 in the northeast of Leicester, east of Rushey Mead. Scott Nichol make traditional socks in Hinckley. HJ Hall of Hinckley are a larger company, who own Pantherella, who make socks in Leicester. Per Una have a factory near Cossington and the A46/A607 junction. Much of Britain's lingerie and hosiery is made in the region. Guilford Europe (former Guilford Kapwood), at Somercotes, makes fabric (warp knitting) for sports clothing and automotive products, and have been owned by Lear Corporation since 2012.

Many footwear companies such as Shoe Zone (which bought out Stead and Simpson), are based in Leicester. Brantano Footwear UK, based in Leicester before 2002, were in Ellistown and Battleflat until March 2017, just south of Coalville near M1 junction 22, nearby to Nestlé's national distribution centre. Loake make shoes at Kettering, and have a Royal appointment. Church's Shoes are at Northampton are also high quality and Barker Shoes are at Earls Barton. Tricker's shoes in Northampton have a royal warrant. Sanders & Sanders and Grenson make shoes in Rushden. Jeffery West make shoes off the A4501 in Cliftonville, east Northampton, near Northampton General Hospital and the head office of Northampton Borough Council. Off the A428 near the hospital is Edward Green Shoes. Crockett & Jones make high-class shoes in the northeast of Northampton, towards Abington, and are the only main shoe factory left in the town. Dr. Martens were until 2003 made at Irthlingborough. The BLC Leather Technology Centre is in Moulton and SATRA, in west Kettering, both conduct footwear research. Aspex make sports sunglasses in Moulton, near Moulton College.

Sports Direct is based in Shirebrook on an old Bolsover coal mine. Wade Spring, the UK's leading manufacturer of upholstery springs, is in Long Eaton off the A6005; next-door at the Trent Business Centre is Sunspel, who introduced the t-shirt to the British market; nearby Meadowmead make premium furniture off the B6540, and Aga Rangemaster Group make kitchen sinks; on the other side of railway Gill (clothing), who make marine clothing. Duresta Upholstery is in Long Eaton, with a factory of DFS opposite. W&G Sissons on the Chesterfield Est, now owned by Franke, has been the UK's largest manufacturer of stainless steel sinks since the 1950s. Parker Knoll make high-end furniture off the B6016 on the Greenhill Industrial Estate, south of Alfreton. Viaton makes micronised barytes at Hopton, Derbyshire. Gunn & Moore (GM), off the A612 north of Trent Bridge cricket ground, is an exclusive cricket bat manufacturer.

Wild Country, on the Tideswell Industrial Estate off the B6049, are the UK's leading manufacturer of rock-climbing equipment. Equip Outdoor Technologies are west of the B600 in Somercotes, who own Lowe Alpine, Rab and Outdoor Designs (gloves). Blacks Leisure Group (previous owner of Blacks and Millets before financial failure and takeover by JD Sports) was based in Duston, in the west of Northampton, and is now off the A45 in the east of the town on the Swan Valley Ind Est, near the UK & Ireland base of Levi Strauss & Co. Joules country clothing is on the A4304, east of Market Harborough at The Point near the A6 roundabout and the Northamptonshire boundary at Dingley.

George at Asda, based at Lutterworth, in 2009 overtook M&S to become Britain's leading fashion retailer. TW Kempton are a main manufacturer of uniforms for the armed and police services opposite the National Space Centre on the A6 in north Leicester; they also own the Fortis body armour brand and make PASGT nylon fibre helmets for troops.

Retail
Wilko head office is at Manton, Worksop; it was founded by James Kemsey Wilkinson in Leicester in 1930. In Lenton, are the head offices of Games Workshop, the producers of Warhammer miniatures. Pendragon PLC, the car dealership and the Sherwood Park industrial area is in Annesley. Sytner Group is in Enderby, a prestige car retailer. Dunelm Group, the furnishings company, is based on the A607 next to Lafarge in Syston; the company is named after Bill Adderley's house on Greenhill Road in Coalville; nearby is Pukka Pies. In Leicester is the nearly-defunct photographic equipment company Jessops, bought and relaunched as Jessops Europe by businessman Peter Jones and Fox's Confectionery (maker of Fox's Glacier Mints), with both based near each other on the Braunstone Frith estate. Also in Leicester are the bookmaker Mark Jarvis (next to Radio Leicester), the European HQ of National Car Rental, and Otis UK (lifts, near the National Space Centre on the A6). Jacobs is on the Meridian Business Park in Braunstone, next to the M1. Machine Mart is based on the A60 near BioCity in Nottingham. East of the Walkers plant in Beaumont Leys is Office Depot UK (and Viking Direct UK) on the Bursom Industrial Estate. Crown Crest in Belgrave owns Poundstretcher. Goldsmiths (jewellers) are based at the western end of Braunstone Frith, off the B5380.

In Northampton is Avon Products UK; its products reach 6m women per week. East Midlands Railway has its head office in Derby. Porterbrook, one of the UK's three rolling stock companies is in Derby. The former East Midlands Electricity is now owned by E.ON UK (supply, since Powergen bought EME in June 1998) and Western Power Distribution (distribution, who bought Central Networks in April 2011), which is based in Long Whatton and Diseworth; the area has around a 5,000 MW demand for electricity. Nearby at Castle Donington is the home of the (separate) headquarters of BMI (in Donington Hall) and bmibaby. Sixt, the car rental firm, has its UK base in Chesterfield, the base of Auto Windscreens. Booker Group, the Cash & Carry, (Happy Shopper and 2,700 Premier Stores, and famous for the Booker Prize) is on B571 in Wellingborough.

Maclaren, the pushchair maker, is near the M1 next to Long Buckby railway station; BabyStyle is in Sileby. There are three main distribution centres in the area at Magna Park in Leicestershire (the largest of its kind in Europe), and Brackmills and the Daventry International Railfreight Terminal in Northamptonshire. J D Wetherspoon have their main distribution centre at Daventry, and Currys (founded in Leicester in 1888 on Belgrave Gate) have theirs at Newark-on-Trent. Oxford University Press have their national distribution centre at North Kettering Business Park at the A6003 roundabout on the A43 Kettering bypass (in Rushton). Monsoon Accessorize have their national distribution centre to the east on Octavian Park in Irchester next to A45. In Kilsby on the DIRFT estate, Tesco have their Daventry Grocery, the largest supermarket depot in the country, west of the A5 and north of the WCML. North of the A428 is Tesco's Clothing Distribution Centre.

Food processing

Silver Spoon makes all of its demerara and brown sugar at Newark-on-Trent. Swizzels Matlow makes children's confectionery in New Mills. Carlsberg has been brewed in Northampton since 1974, with twelve UK depots, and also brews Holsten Pils, and has brewed Tetley since 2011. Cott Beverages UK is in Kegworth. Global Brands (maker of Vodka Kick and Corky's schnapps) is based in Clay Cross. Greencore UK (former Derby-based Hazlewood Foods) is off the A616 at Barlborough Links; its site at Manton Wood Enterprise Zone, Worksop claims to be the world's largest sandwich factory. United Biscuits has a large factory in Ashby-de-la-Zouch where it makes its KP Snacks including Hula Hoops, Skips and Nik Naks. Oxo, Saxa salt, Super Noodles, and Bisto are made by Premier Foods in the west of Worksop. Tangerine Confectionery are at Holmewood (formerly Cadbury Trebor Bassett).

Cat food such as Whiskas is made in Melton Mowbray by Masterfoods; their Waltham Centre for Pet Nutrition on the A607 claims to be the world's leading authority on petfood research. Also in the southwest of the town next to the railway, Samworth Brothers have owned Ginsters since 1977 and Soreen since 2014, and have 8,000 UK employees. Whitworths, the food company, is in Irthlingborough; they also have Victoria Mills flour site on the A509 in Irchester.

The crisp company Walkers (owned by PepsiCo and the UK's biggest grocery brand) makes 10 million bags of crisps a day, using 280,000 tonnes of potatoes a year, at the biggest crisp factory in the world at Beaumont Leys; next door Bradgate Bakery makes sandwiches, and nearby Walker & Sons (Samworth Bros) bake pies at their Charnwood Bakery. Opposite the crisp factory, Beaumont Park is PepsiCo's main research centre in the UK. Pork Farms is in Lenton, Nottingham; Riverside Bakery next door, also owned by Pork Farms, makes food for M&S, Asda and Sainsburys, being the UK's leading chilled quiche manufacturer. Thorntons is a big employer south of Alfreton in Swanwick on a former colliery, since the factory opened in 1985. At Latimer Park (Burton Latimer) at the A6/A14 junction is Alpro, who make soya milk products, and a huge Morrisons depot. To the west is Weetabix, the UK's leading cereal brand, which sources its wheat from a  radius around Kettering, and also make Weetos in Corby; Ready Brek was bought from Lyons in 1990.

Long Clawson Dairy are the biggest producers of Stilton cheese in the UK; the cheese, with Shropshire Blue, is also made in Cropwell Bishop and Colston Bassett. Faccenda Group of Brackley is the second largest processor of chicken in the UK; the company also has the former Cranberry Foods site at Scropton in Derbyshire, the second biggest turkey processor in the UK after Bernard Matthews. In Wigston, Charnwood Foods (former RHM Group) make pizza bases for Pizza Hut and is now owned by Premier Foods; Rossa Ice Cream is next to the Grand Union Canal and nearby is Jacob's Bakery who make 25 million biscuits a week. Délifrance UK is in north-west Wigston.

Greencore Prepared Foods on Moulton Park make half of M&S's sandwiches and sandwich filler pots. Sealord UK make all of Waitrose's white fish products near Caistor. Kettleby Foods, part of Samworth Brothers, make most of Tesco's ready meals in Melton Mowbray. PAS (Grantham) (owned by McCain) make chips at Easton. Jakemans (owned by Lanes Health) make menthol-based sweets at Sutterton. Isoma of Swadlincote makes food handling equipment; Interlevin Refrigeration at Castle Donington is near the M&S distribution centre; Parry Catering and Fabrication in Draycott make catering appliances and equipment; HayssenSandiacre (owned by Barry-Wehmiller) is in Beeston.

Roquette (former ABF-owned ABR Foods) produce starch and bioethanol at Corby near RS Components, and a Morrisons frozen-food depot is near Weldon. Dunkleys make pies at Wellingborough, next to Booker. Opposite Charles Lawrence in Newark, Laurens Patisseries (owned by Bakkavör UK) are Europe's largest manufacturer of cream cakes. Kerry Ingredients make Homepride flour in Gainsborough.

Health care

Boots UK is based in Lenton in Nottingham, with 2,500 UK stores, where Stewart Adams developed Ibuprofen in the 1960s on Rutland Road in West Bridgford, and Vision Express are nearby, next to the A52. Boots was the biggest chemist chain in the world; now A.S. Watson Group is the world's biggest health retail company. Crookes Healthcare, formerly Boots and now Reckitt Benckiser, make Strepsils and Optrex on the enormous Boots site, and Boots Contract Manufacturing (BCM) make products for other firms; it makes Benylin for McNeil. On the ng2 business park, Specsavers have their corporate eyecare and contact lens division. Three out of the four main UK opticians are sited in Nottingham. The MRI scanner was developed at the University of Nottingham by Sir Peter Mansfield; MRI scanners were developed mainly by GEC Medical, once invented; MRI harnesses nuclear magnetic resonance (NMR) of the hydrogen nucleus; Raymond Vahan Damadian of USA also claims the MRI invention.

Queen's Medical Centre (QMC) is one of the largest teaching hospitals in Europe, and the largest hospital in the UK. The CT scanner (X-ray computed tomography) was invented by Newark's Sir Godfrey Hounsfield. Both inventions received Nobel Prizes for Medicine (2003 for MRI and 1979 for CT). Glenfield Hospital (which comes under the UHL NHS Trust) is one of England's main hospitals for coronary care and respiratory diseases; it has a strong international reputation for medical research in cardiac and respiratory health and carried out the world's first percutaneous coronary intervention procedure on a two-year-old child in August 2012 with the largest ECMO unit in the UK.

EMAS is based in Bilborough on the A6002 near junction 26 of the M1. CARE Fertility, the UK's largest independent IVF company, and a pioneer in the field, is next to EMAS on Woodhouse Way Business Park; Simon Fishel developed the world's first IVF degree course at the University of Nottingham. There are three (charity-funded) air ambulance services: the western one is based at EMA, the eastern one is based at RAF Waddington, and the southern one (shared with Warwickshire) is at Coventry Airport. NHS East Midlands is at Sandiacre next to junction 25 of the M1. AstraZeneca had their (closed in 2011) Charnwood R&D site in Loughborough, which was owned by Fisons before 1995, when it was bought by Astra; Fisons was the former Genatosan who made the Sanatogen 'nerve tonic', which was bought by Fisons in 1946, who had previously made fertiliser, and not pharmaceuticals; the Loughborough plant became Fisons Pharmaceuticals in 1964. 3M Health Care (former Riker Laboratories) has a factory in the north of Loughborough on the A6, with its head office on the A60 next to the railway station.

BioCity Nottingham is an important centre for cutting-edge bioscience companies. Slimming World, who help people lose weight, is in Pinxton, near Alfreton off the A38; on the other side of the railway NHS Supply Chain was formed in 2006 on the Cotes Park Industrial Estate in Somercotes; nearby Diversey UK (former JohnsonDiversey) has a manufacturing plant, and is based at the A43/A4500 junction at Weston Favell. Dalatek Plastics make pharmaceutical containers off the B6022 on the Maun Valley Ind Park at Sutton in Ashfield next to the railway. Brunel Healthcare (former Peter Black, Perrigo then NeutraHealth), owned by Elder Pharmaceuticals, in Swadlincote makes food supplements. Off the A60 at Carlton in Lindrick north of Worksop, Robinson Healthcare makes first aid equipment. Patterson Medical UK (including sorbothane insoles) are in Huthwaite, Notts, and Fresenius Medical Care UK (provides most of the NHS's kidney dialysis) are there too.

High technology

Belkin UK (and Linksys) UK is along the A45 in Rushden, Misco is in Wellingborough, and RS Components is in Corby. Pegasus Software, producer of well-known accounting software, is off the A509 in the south of Kettering. Serif Europe is in West Bridgford; Serif developed PagePlus in the 1990s which was the first cheap DTP software. AVG Technologies has its UK head office on Newark's industrial estate. Experian have their large data centre at Fairham House south of Ruddington, with two others in Texas and Brazil. The Ruddington site is connected by a 640 Gbps dark fibre and runs on IBM's z10 with Tivoli. Inter-Activa is at the LCB Depot in Leicester city centre.

Nexor is in Nottingham. Entalysis, a business performance management software company, is located in Burton upon Trent town centre. Amphenol Jaybeam off the A509 in the west of Wellingborough makes cellular telephone base station antennas. Texas Instruments UK have their Semiconductor Design Centre at Northampton next to the A45, previously in Bedford from 1957 to 2005. GE Sensing UK is at Groby off the A50. Oclaro UK (former Bookham), at Caswell Research Centre in Greens Norton (northwest of Towcester) makes indium phosphide wafers and researches photonic integrated circuits and DSDBR tunable lasers.

Finance
Since 1997 Capital One, the Virginia-based credit card company, has had its European HQ at Trent House in Nottingham's city centre in a former Boots UK printing works next to the railway station, and Nottingham City Council since 2009 have taken over the company's Loxley House next door as their HQ. Dublin-based Experian, one of two UK credit-referencing companies, was founded in the city in 1980 (owned by GUS until 2006) and has a large UK HQ to its south west, on the A453 near the River Trent. TDX Group in Nottingham, is now owned by Equifax. Santander (former Alliance & Leicester) is based in Narborough. Barclaycard is headquartered in Northampton, and Nationwide has a large administrative centre at Moulton Park. Staysure (insurance) is in Northampton. Egg Banking was on Pride Park in Derby, until Barclays closed the site in 2011, and moved the business to its Northampton credit card site.

Castle Meadow Campus is the name of a large HMRC site in Nottingham, being the national arm of HMRC that looks after the Enterprise Investment Scheme, Corporate Venturing Scheme, Venture Capital Trusts, and Enterprise Management Incentives, HMRC's Pension Schemes Services, and the Residency department, which deals with Double Taxation Treaties and inheritance tax. It has the Valuation Office Agency for the East Midlands and East of England. Royal Mail have a main administrative centre at Rowland Hill House, opposite the Queen's Park Sports Centre in Chesterfield (HR, pensions, and Vehicle Services). Royal Mail have their National Distribution Centre at Crick, next to the M1; half of Britain's mail goes through there. The Bank of England's MPC Agency for the East Midlands is sited on the ng2 estate, near Experian and its economic data.

NatWest Group has a documents centre (Williams Lea) in Shepshed, where it prints its statements for England and Wales. Orion Security Print, north of Stanton steel works in Ilkeston, produces Odeon cinema tickets and library cards. An office of RR Donnelley on the B5366 in the west of South Wigston, next to the railway, deals with all of Barclaycard's mail. Barclaycard have their Payment Acceptance Centre next to the A45 in Northampton. The Money Shop (owned by Dollar Financial Group) issue payday loans and are the UK's leading cheque-cashing service, being at Castlebridge, Nottingham, north of ng2 and next to the railway. GeoAmey (prisoner transport) are in Whetstone.

Rural

Lincolnshire and Rutland are very agricultural, with much of the UK's arable crops grown in this area. The RAF have many bases in this area too, with the main RAF College at Cranwell near Sleaford; the East Midlands Universities Air Squadron is at Cranwell, also home of the Eastern Region of the Sea Cadet Corps, and the Officer and Aircrew Selection Centre. The RAF's six AWACS aircraft are at RAF Waddington. 16th Regiment Royal Artillery is in Rutland.

After Norfolk, Lincolnshire is the second biggest potato producer in the country, and grows 30% of the country's vegetables. Interflora has its UK HQ in Sleaford; Lincolnshire is the world's leading producer of daffodils (narcissus family); 40% of the flowers bought in the UK are grown there; Butters Group supply many bulbs (Amaryllis) from Low Fulney. Greencell import avocados and grapes on the B1180 near the A16 roundabout at Pinchbeck. The county produces each year enough sugar beet for 350 million bags of sugar and enough wheat for 250 million loaves. Fowler-Welch Coolchain are based in Spalding, as is the UK operation of Bakkavör (former Geest) which is the UK's largest provider of fresh prepared foods.

Princes (former Premier Foods) have a large operation in Little Sutton near to Long Sutton canning vegetables with Fray Bentos meat, and Batchelors peas. Magnadata Group in Boston have the contract for the UK's rail tickets (for ATOC); the orange-style tickets have been in operation since 1990. Silver Spoon's Bardney plant makes the market-leading Askey's dessert toppings. John Deere have their UK base at Langar on the Nottinghamshire/Leicestershire boundary next to the former RAF Langar. The British Geological Survey is in Keyworth. Weatherbys in Wellingborough administer the British horseracing industry, having produced the General Stud Book since 1791.

Entertainment

Skegness and the Lincolnshire coast provides seaside entertainment for many people in the East Midlands with its Butlins 200-acre resort at Ingoldmells. Nottingham and Leicester are a popular night time destination (often for people outside of the East Midlands). Center Parcs UK is based at the Sherwood Energy Village in New Ollerton. The YHA is based in Matlock. Gala Bingo is based in Nottingham; Coral have over 1,800 UK shops. Twycross Zoo is just south of Measham in Leicestershire, and the National Space Centre is in Belgrave in north Leicester. Carlsbro (electronics and speakers) are at South Normanton, on the east side of the M1, at the B6406/A38 junction. Peavey Electronics UK (loudspeakers), are off the A6003, in the southwest of Corby.

Rockingham Motor Speedway is in Corby, and other racetracks include Donington Park and Mallory Park in Leicestershire, and Cadwell Park in Lincolnshire. Silverstone Circuit hosts the British Grand Prix, although the southern half of the track is outside the region. Rutland Water is popular for sailing, fishing and bird-watching. The Peak District National Park became the first national park in the United Kingdom in 1951

Education

Secondary education
Most secondary schools in the East Midlands are comprehensives, although Lincolnshire retains fifteen state grammar schools.

There are around 180,000 students in the region's secondary schools; this is the second lowest number of students in a region in England, after the North East, and more than 100,000 lower than the figure for the West Midlands. Some of the East Midlands' urban secondary schools hold truancy rates above that of the national average, whereas truancy rates in the region's rural secondary schools tend to be lower than the national average.

Nottingham City schools tend to perform less well in terms of GCSE standards, with some Leicester schools suffering a similar problem. Rutland (amongst the highest-performing areas in the region where GCSE standards are concerned) has one of the highest percentages of pupils reaching the threshold of five grade A–C GCSEs (including Maths and English) in England. On a District Council level, Rushcliffe in Nottinghamshire tends to attain some of the region's best GCSE results. Leicestershire and Derbyshire also regularly tend to produce GCSE results at a standard greater than the national average.

At A-level, Nottinghamshire, Lincolnshire and Derbyshire regularly generate results greater than the national average. Nottingham tends to produce better results at A-level than it does at GCSE.

There are eighteen further education colleges in the region, including: New College Nottingham, Central College Nottingham, Leicester College, and Lincoln College.

The regional Learning and Skills Council was headquartered at the Meridian Business Park in Braunstone Town, southwest of Leicester. The LSC has been replaced by the Young People's Learning Agency, and the Skills Funding Agency.

Top twenty state schools in the East Midlands (2015 A-level results)

Caistor Grammar School (1079)
The Becket School, West Bridgford
Brooke Weston Academy
The King's School, Grantham
Kesteven and Sleaford High School
Queen Elizabeth's Grammar School, Ashbourne
West Bridgford School
The Ecclesbourne School
Queen Elizabeth's High School, Gainsborough
William Farr School, Welton
The Priory Academy LSST, Lincoln
King Edward VI Grammar School, Louth
Queen Elizabeth's Grammar School, Alford
Spalding High School
Branston Community Academy
Lady Manners School, Bakewell
Anthony Gell School, Wirksworth
Dronfield Henry Fanshawe School
Bourne Grammar School
Queen Elizabeth's Grammar School, Horncastle (858)

Universities

The East Midlands' universities include:
 University of Nottingham  The region's largest university by student population, with around 33,000 students. The university is often ranked in the British top seven for research power. It is famous for its academic reputation, consistently ranking highly in university league tables. It is the only Russell Group university in the East Midlands. The university has produced several Nobel Prize winners.
 Loughborough University  In addition to its more traditional academic work, Loughborough University is well-regarded for its sporting heritage. One notable sporting alumna is British gold-medallist Paula Radcliffe. The British Olympic athletics team trained at the university as part of their preparations for the 2012 Summer Olympics. The adidas Jabulani football, the official football for the 2010 World Cup, was designed in the university's Sports Technology Institute.
 Nottingham Trent University  Nottingham Trent University is the East Midlands' second largest university (and one of the largest universities in the United Kingdom), with a student population of approximately 24,000.
 University of Leicester  The university has established itself as a leading research-led university and has been named University of the Year of 2008 by the Times Higher Education. The University of Leicester is also the only university ever to have won a Times Higher Education award in seven consecutive years. The University is most famous for the invention of genetic fingerprinting DNA, the discovery of the remains of King Richard III and Space research. It houses Europe's biggest academic centre for space research, in which space probes have been built, most notably the Mars Lander Beagle 2, which was built in collaboration with the Open University. It is a founding partner of the National Space Centre which is based in Leicester.
 De Montfort University  The region's third largest university. It is a public research and teaching university. The university has one of the largest numbers of Teacher Fellows of any UK university and was awarded Centre of Excellence status for its performance practice teaching and student support
 University of Northampton  The only university in Northamptonshire, with two campuses in Northampton and a developing partnership with Silverstone.
 University of Derby  Formerly a centre and college for teacher training, Derby University works closely with businesses of the area with its University of Derby–Corporate programme and has a history of academics dating back to 1851.
 University of Lincoln  An English university founded in 1992, with origins tracing back to the foundation and association with the Hull School of Art 1861.
 Bishop Grosseteste University  The newest university in the East Midlands, formerly a university college.

The region has the lowest proportion of part-time students in England. The region has a higher influx of young people into the region at the university stage than out of the region into other regions' universities. Only 25% of the region's students undertaking a first degree are native to the region.

Sports

The region has a good sporting tradition, with some of the most well-known sports personalities –- David Gower (Leicestershire C.C.C.), Gary Lineker, Rory Underwood (Leicester Tigers) and Jonathan Agnew.

The British Gliding Association is based in Leicester on Meridian Business Park, off the A563 in Braunstone. The National Ice Skating Association is based in Nottingham (and many of Britain's Olympic ice skaters train in Nottingham); Nottingham Panthers are in the Elite Ice Hockey League. The British Caving Association is at Great Hucklow, the UK sports governing body. The British Canoe Union is in Bingham.

The first 1978 BDO World Darts Championship was held in Nottingham, in February 1978, being largely the idea of Nick Hunter, a BBC sports producer, and the event first introduced Sid Waddell.

Football

Notts County F.C. is the world's oldest professional football club, with Nottingham Forest F.C. being the oldest football league side after Notts County's relegation to the National League in 2019. Sam Weller Widdowson brought in shin pads in 1874. The first referee's whistle was at Nottingham in 1872.

Admiral Sportswear at Wigston in Leicestershire made the England football strip from 1974 to 1982, when the company went bankrupt; in 1974 it was the first company to introduce replica kits. Umbro took over the England kit after the 1982 World Cup in 1984. Nike make the England kit today.

The East Midlands is home to several professional and semi-professional association football (soccer) clubs.

Rugby Union
The East Midlands is home to two top-tier (Aviva Premiership) clubs.

Leicester Tigers are an English rugby union club based in Leicester at the Welford Road stadium and play in the Aviva Premiership. They were formed in 1880; their colours are green, burgundy and white. Leicester Tigers are one of the most successful Rugby Union teams in Europe (if not globally) and the most successful English club since the introduction of league rugby in 1987, having won the European cup twice, the first tier of English rugby ten times, and the Anglo-Welsh cup seven times.

Northampton Saints are a professional rugby union club from Northampton, England. They were formed in 1880, and play in black, green, and gold colours. The team play their home games at Franklin's Gardens, which has a capacity of 15,500. Their biggest rivals are Leicester Tigers. "The East Midlands Derby" is one of the fiercest rivalries in English Rugby Union.

Cricket
Nottinghamshire (Trent Bridge), Leicestershire (Grace Road), Derbyshire (County Cricket Ground, Derby) and Northamptonshire (County Cricket Ground, Northampton) are in the Cricket T20 North group; Northamptonshire was formerly in the previous Midlands group.

Basketball
Leicester Riders, who play at Leicester Arena, are the oldest club in British basketball, founded in 1967.

Motor sports
RML Group (Ray Mallock) BTCC and WTCC motorsport team is in Wellingborough, next to the UK HQ of Vredestein tyres (Dutch). Bamboo Engineering WTCC are at Silverstone.

Swimming
The Amateur Swimming Association is the world's first swimming governing body, founded 1869, now based in Loughborough. British Swimming have one of its three Intensive Training Centres at Loughborough University's Loughborough Pool in their Sport Development Centre.

Local media

Television

The BBC East Midlands region of BBC Television, based in Nottingham, produces several regional television programmes including the news programme East Midlands Today from Waltham.  This excludes most of Northamptonshire, north Nottinghamshire and north Derbyshire. Most of Lincolnshire is covered by the BBC Yorkshire and Lincolnshire region based in Hull, with its Look North programme from Belmont; north Nottinghamshire (Retford, Worksop and Bassetlaw), northeast Derbyshire (Chesterfield), the eastern High Peak (Hope Valley) and northern area of the Derbyshire Dales (Tideswell and Hathersage) are covered by BBC Yorkshire from Emley Moor, with its Look North from Leeds. The western area of the High Peak (Buxton, Glossop, New Mills and Chapel-en-le-Frith) in Derbyshire are covered by BBC North West from Winter Hill and Granada Television, both based in Salford.Peterborough - Northamptonshire is part of the BBC East region based in Norwich and has the Look East programme from Sandy Heath. Most of Northamptonshire can receive Central News East, with western parts of the county (Daventry) receiving Central News West, and Southern parts of the county (around Brackley, Towcester and Northampton) receiving the Thames Valley micro-region of ITV Meridian (the former Central South region) and the Oxford opt-out of BBC South Today from Oxford. Central News East also covers the East Midlands, broadcasting from Lenton Lane in Nottingham from March 1984. The studios were closed and is now the King's Meadow Campus of the University of Nottingham. These studios had been responsible for Family Fortunes and Who Wants to Be a Millionaire?. Central News East continues, broadcasting from ITV Central's Birmingham Studios. Northamptonshire has Anglia Television's Anglia Tonight programme and most of Lincolnshire and Nottinghamshire (excluding south Nottinghamshire) has Yorkshire Television's Calendar. For Lincolnshire and South and East Yorkshire. Digital switchover took place in April 2011 for the Nottingham and Northampton areas; Waltham and Belmont (including the local repeater stations) changed in late August 2011.
MATV, based in Leicester, which caters to the area's large South Asian population.

Radio

BBC Radios Derby, Leicester, peterborough, Lincolnshire, Northampton, Nottingham, Manchester (for Glossop, Whaley Bridge and Chapel-en-le-Frith) and Sheffield (for Chesterfield). BBC Radio Leicester was the first local radio station in the United Kingdom.
Many commercial, student and community radio stations: kiss 107.77 peterborough Capital Midlands (formerly Trent FM, RAM FM and Leicester Sound), Gem (formerly Heart 106), Heart East (Northamptonshire) (formerly Northants 96), Demon FM (Leicester), (Peterborough), Peak FM (Chesterfield and North Derbyshire), Lincs FM (Lincolnshire and Newark-on-Trent), Takeover Radio (Leicester & Nottingham), Fosse 107 (Loughborough and Hinckley), heart Harborough FM, The Eye (Melton Mowbray), Greatest Hits Radio Stamford and Rutland (formerly Rutland Radio), Boundary Sound (Newark-on-Trent), Mansfield 103.2 FM, Greatest Hits Radio South Yorkshire (formerly Trax FM) (Bassetlaw), Ashbourne Radio (Ashbourne on 96.7FM & 101.8FM Wirksworth & Ecclesbourne Valley), Amber Sound FM, Erewash Sound, High Peak Radio (Chapel-en-le-Frith), Smooth East Midlands (formerly Connect 97.2 & 106.80, Corby, PCR FM 103.20 ,Kettering & Wellingborough), Sabras Radio, Salaam Radio,and Hindu Sanskar Radio, URN (Uni of Nottingham), Fly FM (Nottingham Trent Uni), Leicester Community Radio Local Radio for over 35's in Leicester 1449AM.
National radio on DAB and FM comes from Sutton Coldfield in the west, Peterborough in the southeast, Belmont (the tallest structure in the region) in the northeast, and Holme Moss in the northwest.

Newspapers
There are a number of daily newspapers, the largest of which include the Derby Telegraph, Derbyshire Times, Leicester Mercury, Lincolnshire Echo, Northampton Chronicle and Echo, and Nottingham Evening Post. Most of the daily papers are owned by Trinity Mirror.

Magazines
There are many regional lifestyle publications, the largest and most widely read being Life&Style Magazine, FHP Magazine Peterborough Nottinghamshire Life and City Life and County Living. National magazine publishers in the region include Key Publishing, Mortons of Horncastle and Bourne Publishing Group.

See also

Midlands
1185 East Midlands earthquake
East Midlands Regional Select Committee
List of schools in the East Midlands
Scouting in the East Midlands
South Midlands, a name for the southern part of the East Midlands.

References

Further reading
 Allen, R.C. Enclosure and the Yeoman: the Agricultural Development of the South Midlands 1450-1850 (Oxford UP, 1992)
 Beckett, John V. The East Midlands from AD 1000 (Addison-Wesley Longman, 1988).
 Dewindt, Edwin Brezett, and Edwin Brezette DeWindt. Land and people in Holywell-cum-Needingworth: structures of tenure and patterns of social organization in an East Midlands village, 1252-1457 (PIMS, 1972).
 Laughton, Jane, Evan Jones, and Christopher Dyer. "The urban hierarchy in the later Middle Ages: a study of the East Midlands." Urban history (2001): 331–357.
 McWhirr, A. L. A. N. The Early Military History of the Roman East Midlands (1970) online.
 Stafford, Pauline. The East Midlands in the Early Middle Ages ( Leicester University, 1985).
 Stobart, Jon. "Regions, Localities, and Industrialisation: Evidence from the East Midlands Circa 1780–1840." Environment and Planning A 33.7 (2001): 1305–1325.
 Tompkins, Matthew. Peasant society in a midlands manor, Great Horwood 1400-1600 (PhD Diss. U of Leicester, 2006) online.
 Townsend, Claire. "County versus region? Migrational connections in the East Midlands, 1700–1830." Journal of Historical Geography 32.2 (2006): 291–312.

External links

East Midlands Councils
East Midlands Regional Strategy
Regional Development Fund 
Government's list of councils in the East Midlands
Climate East Midlands

 
Regions of England
NUTS 1 statistical regions of England
NUTS 1 statistical regions of the European Union